Thakur Dass Bhargava Senior Secondary Model School is an independent school on Rajgarh road section of National Highway 52 in Hisar, in Haryana state in northern India. It is regulated by the Central Board of Secondary Education.

History
This school, founded in 1957 by the INC politician, former Member of parliament and freedom fighter - Pandit "Thakur Das Bhargava", is the first public school (elite private school) of then Hisar district. It was initially named as the "Model School", later renamed to "Senior Model Public High School", then to "Senior Secondary Model School", and finally renamed again after the founder. "Thakur Das Bhargava" (b.1886 - d.1962), the son of Munshi Badri Prasad, was born at Rewari in an upper middle class brahmin family, he passed his matriculation exam from the Government High School, Hisar. As a practicing lawyer, he was member of the "Hisar Bar Council" which came into existence in 1870 CE after the East India Company established the "Hisar Court" in 1832 CE. In 1923 the national organisation "Vidya Pracharini Sabha" was founded by Thakur Das Bhargava and Lala Hardev Sahai in Hisar, under which they set up several schools in and around Hisar district to promote national consciousness, Indian culture and social services. Thakur Das Bhargava was also instrumental in setting up Fateh Chand College for Women at Hisar. Thakur Das Bhargava's brother, Gopi Chand Bhargava,  was a several times Chief Minister of Punjab.

The school is run by the "Hisar Education Society", which is an independent nonprofit organization.

Courses
The school offers K–12 english-medium education system from preschool (nursery) to 10+2 (senior secondary). It is a day-boarding only coeducational school with no hostel facilities.

Facilities
Established on 16 acres or 60,000+ sqm land; the school has 10,000 sqm buildup area; 30,000 sqm sports ground; 20,234 sqm play area; 58 class rooms; 4 science and computer labs; 1 library; indoor games; dance rooms; music rooms and medical checkup facilities.

Sahodya Schools
This school is also the official head office of the "Hisar Sahodya Schools" (HSS) - a registered nonprofit society of 26 CBSE affiliated schools of Hisar district, which was founded in 1986 to share the innovative methods in teaching, education management, teacher's professional growth and vocationalisation of education. The term "sahodya" means "rising together". HSS holds the annual sports and cultural events as well as regular workshops of the member schools.

See also
 List of schools in Hisar
 List of universities and colleges in Hisar
 List of institutions of higher education in Haryana

References

External links
 TDB SSM School Official website
 Hisar Sahodya Schools official website

Citations

Schools in Hisar (city)
Private schools in Haryana
Boys' schools in India
Boarding schools in Haryana